Raymond Ronny Sutton (born 1950) is an American Anglican bishop. He was bishop coadjutor in the Diocese of Mid-America of the Reformed Episcopal Church, since 1999, a founding member of the Anglican Church in North America, in 2009. He is the former Rector of the Church of the Holy Communion in Dallas, Texas, president and Professor of Scripture and Theology at Cranmer Theological House in Houston, Texas, and headmaster of Holy Communion Christian Academy (formerly Bent Tree Episcopal School). Sutton was born in Louisville, Kentucky, and moved to Dallas at age thirteen.

He is currently head of the Ecumenical Relations Committee of the Anglican Church of North America.

He took over the leadership of the Reformed Episcopal Church and the Diocese of Mid-America on November 24, 2016, upon the death of Royal U. Grote Jr., on a provisional level, with his installation taking place on June 15, 2017.

Personal life
Sutton is married to Susan Jean Schaerdel of Dallas. They have seven children and four grandchildren.

Education
 Bachelor of Fine Arts [B.F.A.] – Southern Methodist University in (1972)
 Master of Theology [Th.M.] – Dallas Theological Seminary (1976)
 Doctor of Philosophy [Ph.D.] – Wycliffe Hall, Oxford University, in association with Coventry University (1998)
 Doctor of Theology (hon.) – Central School of Religion
 Doctor of Divinity (hon.) – Cummins Theological Seminary

Career

Sutton served in parish ministry from 1976 until 1991. He was a co-pastor with James B. Jordan of Westminster Presbyterian Church in Tyler, Texas, which was a prominent church in the Christian Reconstructionist movement. Other members included Gary North and David Chilton. The church belonged to the Westminster Presbyterian Church of the Association of Reformation Churches in America. North praised Sutton for uncovering that Meredith G. Kline's five-point covenant model applied to the whole Bible, and that it applies to three covenant institutions of family, state and church.

Sutton served as Dean and Associate Professor of New Testament at the Reformed Episcopal Seminary in Philadelphia from 1991 until 1995; and Dean and Professor of Theology at Cranmer Theological House in Shreveport, Louisiana from 1995 until 2001. Since the Synod of the Reformed Episcopal Diocese of Mid America in February 2013, he is once again the president of Cranmer Theological House based in the Houston area. Cranmer House also supports a satellite campus in Dallas at Sutton's parish, The Church of the Holy Communion (The DMA Pro Cathedral).

Sutton was ordained a bishop coadjutor of the Reformed Episcopal Church in 1999 and arrived at the Church of the Holy Communion in 2001.

Works
Sutton has authored several theology works:
 The Sacramental Theology of Daniel Waterland (Doctoral Thesis—Coventry University), 1998.
 Signed, Sealed and Delivered: A Study of Holy Baptism, Classical Anglican Press, Houston, TX (2001). 
 Captains and Courts, a Biblical Defense of Episcopal Government.
 Second Chance: Biblical Principals of Divorce and Remarriage, Biblical Hope for the Divorced, Biblical Blueprint Series Vol. #10, The Institute for Christian Economics, (1988).
 That You May Prosper : Dominion by Covenant, The Institute for Christian Economics, (1987).
 Who Owns the Family? : God or the State? Biblical Blueprint Series Vol. #03, Dominion Press, Ft. Worth, TX, (1986).
 Ray Sutton, David Chilton, Gary DeMar, Victoria T. deVries, Michael Gilstrap, Power for Living, Arthur S. DeMoss Foundation, (1983).

Articles
 Sutton, Ray R. "Covenantal Evil." Covenant Renewal 2 (1988) 4.
 Sutton, Ray R. "Oath and Symbol." Covenant Renewal 3 (1989) 4: 1–4.
 Sutton, Ray R. "Clothing and Calling." in The Reconstruction of the Church. Christianity and Civilization Vol 4. ed. James B. Jordan. Tyler, Texas: Geneva Ministries, (1985).
 Sutton, Ray R. "The Saturday Night Church and the Liturgical Nature of Man." in The Reconstruction of the Church. Christianity and Civilization Vol 4. ed. James B. Jordan. Tyler, Texas: Geneva Ministries, (1985).
 Ray R. Sutton, "The Church as a Shadow Government," Christianity and Civilization III: Tactics of Christian Resistance, Geneva Divinity School, (1983).
 Ray Sutton, "The Baptist Failure", Christianity & Civilization, James B. Jordan, ed., Geneva Divinity School, (1982).

Editor
 What is Anglicanism?, Latimer Press (2004), by Mark F. M. Clavier, co-edited by Ray Sutton and Peter C. Moore.

References

External links 
 

|-

Living people
21st-century Anglican bishops in the United States
Bishops of the Anglican Church in North America
Bishops of the Reformed Episcopal Church
Presiding Bishops of the Reformed Episcopal Church
Reformed Episcopal Seminary faculty
Southern Methodist University alumni
Alumni of Wycliffe Hall, Oxford
Dallas Theological Seminary alumni
Religious leaders from Louisville, Kentucky
1950 births